Marema is a Brazilian municipality in the state of Santa Catarina.

See also
List of municipalities in Santa Catarina

References

Municipalities in Santa Catarina (state)